Frank John Bersbach Sr. (December 16, 1888 - January 26, 1929) was the vice president and general manager of the Manz Corporation.

Biography
He was born on December 16, 1888, in Chicago, Illinois. He married Johanna Brentano. He died on January 26, 1929.

Legacy

Bersbach Sr.'s legacy was his son, Frank John Bersback Jr. His son would be the first of five husbands to Florida socialite Durie Malcolm, whose later third husband was the future 35th U.S. President John Fitzgerald Kennedy, whom she secretly married on January 24, 1947, in Palm Beach, Florida, before he later married Jacqueline Bouvier. Frank John Jr. later married actress Dorothy Lee.

According to a book by Antoinette Giancana about her father, Mafia boss Sam Giancana, JFK's father Joseph P. Kennedy Sr. went to Sam Giancana and asked him to find a way to have the marriage annulled and the legal documents destroyed – which he reportedly did.

References

1888 births
1929 deaths
Businesspeople from Chicago
American aviators
20th-century American businesspeople